Vyazmikin is a Russian surname. Notable people with the surname include:

 Dmitri Vyazmikin (born 1972), Russian footballer and manager
 Igor Vyazmikin (1966–2009), Soviet and Russian ice hockey player and coach

Russian-language surnames